Juuso Honka (born March 11, 1990) is a Finnish professional ice hockey player who played with HPK in the SM-liiga during the 2010-11 season.

References

External links

1990 births
Finnish ice hockey forwards
HPK players
Living people
Sportspeople from Turku